Adaina primulacea  is a moth of the family Pterophoridae. It is known from Taboga Island in the Gulf of Panama, Costa Rica and southern Florida, United States. It is probably widespread throughout the Neotropics, including the West Indies and Central and South America.

The length of the forewings is 6–7 mm for males and 7–8 mm for females. The forewings are straw‑yellow. The hindwings are yellow‑grey and the fringes are yellow‑white. Adults are on wing in September and December.

The larvae feed on Chromolaena odorata. First instar larvae mine young stems and shoots of their host plant, causing it to produce a gall. The later instars are stem borers, primarily within the galls. There are probably five larval instars. Pupation occurs within the hollowed-out gall chamber formed by larval feeding on gall tissue.

References

Moths described in 1929
Oidaematophorini